Sesame Disco is an album made by the cast of Sesame Street in 1979. It was nominated for a Grammy Award for Best Recording for Children.

Track listing 
 "What Makes Music?" – The Entire Cast
 "Me Lost Me Cookie at the Disco" – Cookie Monster & the Girls
 "The Happiest Street in the World" – Big Bird, the Kids & the Girls "Sing" – The Girls
 "Disco Frog" – Kermit the Frog & the Girls
 "Doin' the Trash" - Oscar the Grouch & the Girls
 "Bein' Green" – Kermit the Frog & the Girls
 "The Happiest Street in the World (Reprise)" - The Kids & the Girls

See also 
 Sesame Street discography

Sesame Street albums
1979 albums
Disco albums by American artists